Bay K8644 is a chemical compound that functions as an L-type calcium channel agonist. Bay K8644 is used primarily as a biochemical research tool for this effect.

Mechanism of action
Bay K8644 targets L-type voltage-gated calcium channels. It is the first positive inotropic agent shown to act specifically and directly on calcium channels.

References

Dihydropyridines
Trifluoromethyl compounds
Methyl esters
Calcium channel openers
Nitro compounds